Extravagance is a 1930 pre-Code romance film directed by Phil Rosen and released by Tiffany Pictures.

Plot summary
Alice Kendall is the darling of her social set, the sons and daughters of millionaires.  Unbeknownst to Alice, her mother has impoverished herself to provide Alice the luxuries she expects.  When Alice becomes engaged to businessman Fred Garlan, her mother spends the last of her money on Alice's trousseau.

Feeling stifled in her marriage because of Fred's long hours, Alice spends more than Fred can bring in, causing strain in the marriage. When she asks for a sable coat like her friend owns, Fred makes it clear they cannot afford it.

When a well-known playboy named Morrell helps her get one through a phony stock deal, Alice and Fred's marriage is brought to the breaking point.

Cast
June Collyer as Alice Kendall
Lloyd Hughes as Fred Garlan
Owen Moore as Jim Hamilton
Dorothy Christy as Esther Hamilton
Jameson Thomas as Morrell
Gwen Lee as Sally
Robert Agnew as Billy
Nella Walker as Mrs. Kendall
Martha Mattox as Guest
Arthur Hoyt as Guest

DVD release
Extravagance was released on Region 0 DVD-R by Alpha Video on January 28, 2014.

References

External links

1930 films
1930s romance films
American black-and-white films
Films directed by Phil Rosen
American romance films
Tiffany Pictures films
1930s English-language films
1930s American films